Ranong United Football Club (Thai สโมสรฟุตบอลระนอง ยูไนเต็ด) is a Thai professional football club based in Ranong province. The club currently play in Thai League 2. This football Club change name to Ranong United at 2015 because the club was changes their chairman.

Timeline
History of events of Ranong Football Club

Stadium and locations

Season by season record

Players

Current squad

Club staff

Affiliated clubs 
  Buriram United F.C.
  PT Prachuap F.C.

External links
 Official Website
 Official Facebookpage

Football clubs in Thailand
Association football clubs established in 2010
Ranong province
2010 establishments in Thailand